The biennial nonpartisan election for the Mayor of Raleigh, North Carolina, was held on Tuesday, Oct. 10, 2017. As no candidate won a majority of the vote in the first round, a runoff was held on November 7, 2017, as requested by the second-place finisher, Charles Francis. Incumbent Mayor Nancy McFarlane defeated Francis in the runoff, winning a fourth term in office.

This was the first Raleigh mayoral election to advance to a second round since 2001.

Candidates

Declared
Paul Fitts
Charles Francis, attorney and former City Council member
Nancy McFarlane, Mayor since 2011, former City Council member

First-round Results

Runoff Results

Notes

2017
Raleigh
Raleigh mayoral